Alien Thunder (also known as Dan Candy's Law) is a 1974 Canadian Northern film directed by Claude Fournier and starring Donald Sutherland. Its original screenplay was written by W.O. Mitchell but Mitchell removed his name from the final release due to changes that were made.

Synopsis
Set in 1890s Saskatchewan after the North-West Rebellion, Alien Thunder is based on a true story about a Woods Cree (Gordon Tootoosis in his first film role) who kills a North-West Mounted Police sergeant (Kevin McCarthy) under desperate circumstances. Hunted for two years by the sergeant's resolute partner (Donald Sutherland), the ending brings tragedy for all those involved.

Cast

Production 
Alien Thunder was filmed in Saskatchewan's Battleford, Duck Lake, and Saskatoon.

Release
The film was not a financial success. "Suspense is lacking and characters are generally underdeveloped, as is the tension between the Mounties and the Indians." – Natalie Edwards, Cinema Canada

References

External links 
 
 

1974 films
1974 drama films
1974 independent films
1974 Western (genre) films
Canadian Western (genre) films
Canadian independent films
English-language Canadian films
Films directed by Claude Fournier
Films scored by Georges Delerue
Films set in Saskatchewan
Northern (genre) films
Royal Canadian Mounted Police in fiction
Troma Entertainment films
Western (genre) films based on actual events
1970s English-language films
1970s Canadian films